Velaro, Inc. is a software-as-a-service (SaaS) provider headquartered in Elkridge, Maryland. The company provides live chat software with click-to-call and intelligent engagement features.

Company information 

Velaro was founded in 2001. Velaro is a live chat software provider.

Third-party integrations 

Velaro integrates with the following systems:
 Salesforce
 Microsoft Dynamics CRM
 Google Translate
 Google Analytics
 Get Satisfaction
 NetSuite
 SugarCRM
 Zendesk

References 

Software companies based in Maryland
Cloud computing providers
Service-oriented (business computing)
Companies established in 2000
Software companies of the United States